= Phonetic sciences =

Phonetic sciences may refer to:

- Phonetics, the study of the sounds of human speech
- Phonology, the study of the sound system of a specific language (or languages)
